Negera confusa is a moth in the family Drepanidae. It was described by Francis Walker in 1855. It is found in Cameroon, Ghana, Ivory Coast, Nigeria, Sierra Leone and the Gambia.

The length of the forewings is 19–23 mm. The base of the forewings is buff and there is a trace of an antemedial fascia. The area between the antemedial fascia and postmedial fascia is reddish brown or yellowish brown enclosing a large lustrous, paler, purplish-brown area. There is a small, black discocellular spot and a large, dark spot close to the cell. The postmedial fascia is buff and edged proximally with brown or black. The area distal to the postmedial fascia is reddish or yellowish brown near the apex and tornus and buff in the middle. The subterminal fascia is represented by short, whitish dashes and the costa of the forewings and the area between the antemedial and postmedial fasciae is lustrous. The whole wing is speckled with black. The hindwings are similar to the forewings in colouration of the medial fascia and the area proximal to this, but without the pale medial patch. The ground colour of the rest of the hindwing is similar, but darker at the outer angle and there is a black discocellular spot.

References

Moths described in 1855
Drepaninae
Moths of Africa